The Australian Superbike Championship (ASBK) is a national motorcycle racing championship in Australia, organized by Motorcycling Australia.

History

The story of the Australian Superbike Championship begins in 1980, at a time in motorcycle sport when the premier road racing series globally was the 500cc Grand Prix world championship. The issue with 500s at that time was that manufacturer teams were investing large amounts of funding to develop their machines and riders to a level of sophistication that was far removed from what was commercially available to the public. This resulted in a very expensive racing programme, especially for privateers.

The need for a road race series that offered ease of entry for national riders was evident - one that was open to all makes of production motorcycles, machines which required little modification and development from standard road going trim. Enter the Australian Superbike Series.
Australia’s flagship road race in 1980 through to 1986 was called the ‘Australian Superbike Series’, that featured large capacity production motorcycles which at the time, were some of the most competitive in the world ‘out of the box’. Winning bikes were mostly Japanese manufactured inline four cylinder powered machines readily available for public purchase in Australia. The motorcycle manufacturers idiom of the day being “Race on Sunday, sell on Monday”, a reference to motorcycle sales figures on the back of a particular marque’s race win.

For two years spanning 1987- 1988, political and economic influences saw the renaming of the Series to ‘The Australian Endurance Championship’.  Again, the Endurance Championship was the premier road racing competition in the country, which in 1989 once again morphed, into what was called, the ‘Australian Superbike Championship’ run under the Australian Road Race Championship banner.

Over the years the Championship has been run by Motorcycling Australia (MA) in conjunction with private promoters and clubs. And it proved to be a successful formula with success at its peak in the 1990s to early 2000s, however further economic challenges hit the series hard. With struggling competitor numbers, spectators and media exposure, MA opted to step in as the primary promoter, rekindling the championship as the Australian Superbike Championship or ‘ASBK’.

Over the following years, the ASBK has seen unprecedented growth and an increased talent pool, with the Championship forming the perfect springboard for riders and teams to avail themselves of opportunities abroad and on international podiums.

The ASBK is structured in a progressive format that caters for a variety of motorcycle classes, riders, and abilities. Starting with the Australian GP Juniors Cup that is based purely on a single make 150cc production bike for riders aged between 12 and under 16 years old right through to the Australian Superbike category featuring some of the largest capacity motorcycles currently available on the domestic market.
The MA Championship has laid the foundations for riders to not only showcase their talents, but to provide opportunities for the continuing development of their race craft and a clearly defined pathway for progression from junior programs through to the elite Superbike class.

Champions
Src:

References

External links
Official website

Motorcycle road racing series
Superbike
National championships in Australia